Mirrors of the Unseen: Journeys in Iran (2006) is a travel book written by British travel writer Jason Elliot.

See also
An Unexpected Light: Travels in Afghanistan

External links
Mirrors of the Unseen: Journeys in Iran reviewed by the Times newspaper.
Mirrors of the Unseen: Journeys in Iran reviewed by the Guardian.
How reality failed to live up to a dream by Amir Taheri of the Times newspaper

Books about Iran
2006 non-fiction books
British travel books